The women's marathon event at the 1990 Commonwealth Games was held in Auckland, New Zealand on 31 January 1990.

Results

References

Marathon
1990
1990 in women's athletics
Comm
1990 Commonwealth Games